The France women's national cricket team is the team that represents the country of France in international women's cricket matches. They became an associate member of the International Cricket Council (ICC) in 1998, having previously been an affiliate member since 1987.

In April 2018, the ICC granted full Women's Twenty20 International (WT20I) status to all its members. Therefore, all Twenty20 matches played between France women and another international side after 1 July 2018 will be a full WT20I.

In December 2020, the ICC announced the qualification pathway for the 2023 ICC Women's T20 World Cup. The France women's team made their debut at an ICC women's event when they played in the 2021 ICC Women's T20 World Cup Europe Qualifier group.

Women's cricket in France
In May 2011, "Coupe de France Féminine" has been established as part of a continuing commitment to the women's game in France. The first ever representative France women's team, les "Dames de France" played against Jersey Ladies (2011, Saumur and 2013, Jersey).  Creation of an Indoor Women's National Championship is the newest development, involving four teams over four tournaments in 2013.

Older women too play in some clubs alongside their male counterparts, but efforts are now being specifically directed to involving women of all ages in the sport as part of the high priority being given to the development of women's cricket.

Tournament history

ICC Women's World Twenty20 Europe Qualifier
 2021: 5th (DNQ)

Records and statistics
International Match Summary — France Women
 
Last updated 8 May 2022

Twenty20 International 

 Highest team total: 167/2 v Austria on 8 May 2022 at Dreux Sport Cricket Club, Dreux.
 Highest individual score: 68*, Tara Britton v Austria on 8 May 2022 at Dreux Sport Cricket Club, Dreux.
 Best individual bowling figures: 5/14, Emmanuelle Brelivet v Austria on 1 August 2019 at Parc du Grand Blottereau, Nantes.

T20I record versus other nations

Records complete to WT20I #1075. Last updated 8 May 2022.

See also
 List of France women Twenty20 International cricketers

References

External links
 Official site
 FemaleCricket-France
 Cricinfo-France

1987 establishments in France
Cricket in France
France in international cricket
Women's national cricket teams
Cricket